Pierre Bouguer (16 February 1698, Croisic – 15 August 1758, Paris) was a French mathematician, geophysicist, geodesist, and astronomer. He is also known as "the father of naval architecture".

Career

Bouguer's father, Jean Bouguer, one of the best hydrographers of his time, was Regius Professor of hydrography at Le Croisic in lower Brittany, and author of a treatise on navigation. He taught his sons Pierre and Jan at their home, where he also taught private students. In 1714, at the age of 16, Pierre was appointed to succeed his deceased father as professor of hydrography. In 1727 he gained the prize given by the French Academy of Sciences for his paper On the masting of ships, beating Leonhard Euler; and two other prizes, one for his dissertation On the best method of observing the altitude of stars at sea, the other for his paper On the best method of observing the variation of the compass at sea. These were published in the Prix de l'Académie des Sciences.

In 1729 he published Essai d'optique sur la gradation de la lumière, the object of which is to define the quantity of light lost by passing through a given extent of the atmosphere, and became the first known discoverer of what is now more commonly known as the Beer-Lambert law. He found the light of the sun to be 300 000 times more intense than that of the moon, and thus made some of the earliest measurements in photometry. In 1730 he was made professor of hydrography at Havre, and succeeded Pierre Louis Maupertuis as associate geometer of the Academy of Sciences. He also invented a heliometer, afterwards perfected by Joseph von Fraunhofer. He was afterwards promoted in the Academy to the place of Maupertuis, and went to reside in Paris.

Bouguer's Mémoire presented to the Academy of Sciences in 1734 and published in 1736 was the first treatise on the theory of dome.

In 1735 Bouguer sailed with Charles Marie de La Condamine on a scientific mission to Peru, to measure the length of a degree of latitude in the meridian arc near the equator. Ten years were spent in this operation, a full account of which was published by Bouguer in 1749, La figure de la terre (French for "the figure of the earth"). 

In 1746 he published the first treatise of naval architecture, Traité du navire, which among other achievements first explained the use of the metacenter as a measure of ships' stability. His later writings were nearly all upon the theory of navigation and naval architecture.

In January 1750 he was elected a Fellow of the Royal Society.

Works

Recognition
A crater on Mars was named in his honour. A lunar crater and an asteroid were also named after him.

His name is also recalled as the meteorological term Bouguer's halo (also known as Ulloa's halo, after Antonio de Ulloa, a Spanish member of his South American expedition) which an observer may see infrequently in fog when sun breaks through (for example, on a mountain) and looks down-sun – effectively a "Fog bow" (as opposed to a "rain-bow"). It is "An infrequently observed meteorological phenomenon; a faint white, circular arc or complete ring of light that has a radius of 39 degrees and is centred on the antisolar point. When observed, it is usually in the form of a separate outer ring around an anticorona."

The term Bouguer anomaly, referring to small regional variations in the Earth's gravity field resulting from density variations in underlying rocks, is named after him.

A large bronze statue of him stands at the port in Le Croisic;
see Works by Jean Fréour.

See also
 List of geophysicists
 Radiodrome
 Schiehallion experiment

References

 
 Lamontagne, Roland. "La vie et l’oeuvre de Pierre Bouguer (The life and work of Pierre Bouguer)" Montreal: Presses de l’Université de Montréal, 1964
 Lamontagne, Roland. "Pierre Bouguer, 1698–1758, un Blaise Pascal du XVIIIe siècle; Suivi d'une correspondence (Pierre Bouguer, 1698–1758, a Blaise Pascal of the 18th century; followed by correspondence)". Manuscript. Montreal: Université de Montreal, 1998

External links

www-history; biographie on Bouguer

1698 births
1758 deaths
18th-century French mathematicians
Members of the French Academy of Sciences
18th-century French astronomers
French geodesists
Fellows of the Royal Society
Naval architects